Montrose Avenue is a street in Chicago. It is served by stations on the Chicago Transit Authority (CTA)'s Brown Line and Blue Line. The CTA also provides the #78 Montrose bus on the street.

References

Streets in Chicago